The County of Anglesey is one of the 37 counties of Victoria which are part of the cadastral divisions of Australia, used for land titles. It is located to the east of Seymour, on both sides of the Goulburn River. The county was proclaimed in 1849.

Parishes 
Parishes include:
 Acheron, Victoria
 Alexandra, Victoria
 Banyarmbite, Victoria
 Billian, Victoria
 Buxton, Victoria
 Derril, Victoria
 Dropmore, Victoria (also in Delatite)
 Eildon, Victoria
 Flowerdale, Victoria
 Ghin Ghin, Victoria
 Glendale, Victoria
 Gobur, Victoria
 Granton, Victoria
 Kerrisdale, Victoria
 Killingworth, Victoria
 Kobyboyn, Victoria
 Maintongoon, Victoria
 Mangalore, Victoria
 Merton, Victoria (also in Delatite)
 Mohican, Victoria
 Molesworth, Victoria
 Murrindindi, Victoria
 Nar-be-thong, Victoria (also in Evelyn)
 Niagaroon, Victoria
 Steavenson, Victoria
 Switzerland, Victoria
 Taggerty, Victoria
 Tallarook, Victoria
 Thornton, Victoria
 Traawool, Victoria
 Whanregarwen, Victoria
 Windham, Victoria
 Woodbourne, Victoria
 Worrough, Victoria
 Yarck, Victoria
 Yea, Victoria

References
Vicnames, place name details
Research aids, Victoria 1910
Cadastral map of Anglesey showing county and parish boundaries, 1880s, National Library of Australia

Counties of Victoria (Australia)